Wat Buppharam may refer to:

 Wat Buppharam, Chiang Mai (วัดบุพพาราม), a Buddhist temple in Chiang Mai
 Wat Buppharam, Penang (วัดบุปผาราม), a Buddhist temple near George Town, Penang, Malaysia
 Wat Buppharam, Trat (วัดบุปผาราม), a Buddhist temple in Trat
 Wat Suan Dok, also known as Wat Buppharam (วัดบุปผาราม), a Buddhist temple in Chiang Mai